Five ships named Houghton, the first for Houghton Hall, the family home of Sir Robert Walpole, served the British East India Company between 1724 and 1799:

 was launched in 1724 and sold in 1736 after four voyages. She then traded with North America and the West Indies.
 was launched in 1738 and made three voyages for the EIC before she was sold in 1749 for service as a West Indiaman.
 was launched in 1751 and made four voyages for the EIC before she was sold in 1764: she was still trading in 1766.
 was launched in 1766 and made four voyages for the EIC before she was sold in 1778. She became an armed escort and transport ship until the Combined French and Spanish fleet captured her in 1780.
 was launched in 1782 and made six voyages for the EIC before she was sold in 1799. She foundered in 1803.

Ship names
Ships of the British East India Company